Muttonbird Island may refer to:

 Muttonbird Island Nature Reserve, New South Wales, Australia
 Muttonbird Island (Lord Howe Island), offshore island of Lord Howe Island, New South Wales, Australia
 One of The Twelve Apostles (Victoria) in Australia
 Mutton Bird Island, Tasmania, Australia
 Shelter Island (Western Australia), also known as Muttonbird Island

See also
 Titi / Muttonbird Islands